Neolasioptera is a genus of gall midges, insects in the family Cecidomyiidae. There are at least 130 described species in Neolasioptera.

See also
 List of Neolasioptera species

References

Further reading

External links

 

Cecidomyiinae
Cecidomyiidae genera
Gall-inducing insects